Thomas Metzger (born 26 February 1959) is an Austrian equestrian. He competed in two events at the 1996 Summer Olympics.

References

External links
 

1959 births
Living people
Austrian male equestrians
Olympic equestrians of Austria
Equestrians at the 1996 Summer Olympics
Sportspeople from Vienna